Mabel B. Hope (born 1880) was a British socialist activist.

Hope became a socialist in 1897, and in 1898 began working in the telegraph department of the Post Office.  She joined the Postal Telegraph Clerks' Association in 1901, and also became active in the Women's Trade Union League, moving to work for it full-time.

Hope was a supporter of the Labour Party and a founder member of the Women's Labour League.  From 1906 until 1908, she served on the executive of the league, and at the 1907 Labour Party conference, she spoke in support of women's suffrage.

References

1880 births
Year of death missing
English socialists